5052 is an aluminium–magnesium alloy, primarily alloyed with magnesium and chromium.

Chemical properties
The alloy composition of 5052 is:
 Magnesium - 2.2%-2.8% by weight
 Chromium - 0.15%-0.35% maximum
 Copper - 0.1% maximum
 Iron - 0.4% maximum
 Manganese - 0.1% maximum
 Silicon - 0.25% maximum
 Zinc - 0.1% maximum
 Remainder Aluminium

A similar alloy A5652 exists differing only in impurities limits.

Mechanical properties

Uses
Typical applications include marine, aircraft, architecture, general sheet metal work, heat exchangers, fuel lines and tanks, flooring panels, streetlights, appliances, rivets and wire.

The exceptional corrosion resistance of 5052 alloy against seawater and salt spray makes it a primary candidate for the failure-sensitive large marine structures, like tanks of liquefied natural gas tankers.

Weldability
Weldability – Gas: Good

Weldability – Arc: Very Good

Weldability – Resistance: Very Good

Brazability: Acceptable

Solderability: Not recommended

References

Aluminium alloy table 

5052
Aluminium–magnesium alloys